Tyron Brian Proctor (born 27 February 1987) is an Australian speedway rider.

Career
Born in Longwarry, Victoria, Proctor attended the Longwarry Primary School and Drouin Secondary College. Ty's brother Toby was also a speedway rider. Proctor started riding motorbikes after being left one by a relative who had died of leukaemia.

After finishing fourth in the Western Australia Solo Championship, Proctor began his British speedway career in 2008 with Redcar Bears in the Premier League, also riding in the Elite League for Peterborough Panthers. He stayed with the Bears in 2009, but in the Elite League switched to Wolverhampton Wolves, with whom he won the Elite League and the Elite Shield, and stayed with the team through to the end of the 2014 season, winning the Elite Shield again in 2011. In 2010 he won the Victoria Solo Championship. He also rode in the Premier League for Plymouth Devils (2013), Sheffield Tigers (2014–2015), and Workington Comets (from 2017), his career interrupted by visa issues in 2015 and 2016. His 2013 season finished early after sustaining fractured vertebrae in a crash at Edinburgh. 

In 2018 he moved from the Wolves to King's Lynn Stars in the newly-formed SGB Premiership, staying with Comets in the new SGB Championship, winning the SGB Championship and the Championship Shield that year. He started the 2019 season with the Stars and Sheffield Tigers, but after losing both places, was signed by Peterborough Panthers and Leicester Lions.

In 2021, he rode for the King's Lynn Stars in the SGB Premiership 2021 and the Leiester Lions in the SGB Championship 2021. In 2022, he rode for the Berwick Bandits in the SGB Championship 2022.

References

1987 births
Living people
Australian speedway riders
Redcar Bears riders
Peterborough Panthers riders
Wolverhampton Wolves riders
Plymouth Devils riders
Sheffield Tigers riders
Workington Comets riders
King's Lynn Stars riders
Leicester Lions riders